Giorgio Pastina (1905–1956) was an Italian screenwriter and film director. He directed Henry IV, a 1943 film version of Luigi Pirandello's Henry IV.

Selected filmography

Director
 Henry IV (1943)
 The Ways of Sin (1946)
 Vanity (1947)
 William Tell (1949)
 Sicilian Uprising (1949)
 Alina (1950)
 Giovinezza (1952)
 Matrimonial Agency (1953)
 Cardinal Lambertini (1954)
 Of Life and Love (1954)
 Letter from Naples (1954)

Screenwriter
 Fedora (1942)
 A Living Statue (1943)
 Farewell Love! (1943)

References

External links 
 

1905 births
1956 deaths
20th-century Italian screenwriters
Italian male screenwriters
Italian film directors
People from Andria
20th-century Italian male writers